Wuggubun is a small Aboriginal community, located in the Kimberley region of Western Australia, within the Shire of Wyndham-East Kimberley.

Governance 
The community is managed through its incorporated body, Wuggubun Aboriginal Corporation, incorporated under the Aboriginal Councils and Associations Act 1976 on 8 August 1990.

Town planning 
Wuggubun Layout Plan No.1 has been prepared in accordance with State Planning Policy 3.2 Aboriginal Settlements. Layout Plan No.1 is yet to be endorsed by the community. As such the Layout Plan exists only as a draft.

Notes

External links
 Office of the Registrar of Indigenous Corporations

Towns in Western Australia
Aboriginal communities in Kimberley (Western Australia)